The Ferrari 408 4RM is a prototype car built by Ferrari in 1987. It was the first Ferrari to feature 4-wheel drive.

History 
The 408 4RM featured a hydraulic four-wheel-drive system developed by Ferrari, and was the first Ferrari to feature 4-wheel drive. The 408 remained as the only Ferrari to use 4-wheel drive until the Ferrari FF, introduced in 2011, which became the first production Ferrari with 4 wheel drive. The FF also uses a system called "4RM", which is said to be more technologically advanced and lighter than the system in the 408, and its unclear whether it shares any of its design with the 408. 

Two copies were built, based on a design by I.DE.A Institute. The first one, chassis no. 70183, was painted in red and was fitted with an all-steel welded chassis and was built in June 1987. The second one, chassis no 78610, was painted yellow and had an aluminum frame bonded with adhesives. The second car was completed in September 1988 and has been exhibited at the Galleria Ferrari in Maranello.

The model name was linked to the characteristics of the engine, with the 40 in 408 standing for its 4.0 L displacement, and the 8 representing the number of cylinders. The abbreviation "4RM" stood for “4 Ruote Motrici”, meaning four-wheel drive.

The 408 4RM was featured on the cover of Road & Track in December 1988.

Performance 
 
The engine has a compression ratio of 9.8: 1 and a bore and stroke of 93 mm and 73.6 mm respectively, bringing total displacement to 3 999.66 cm³ (4.0 L). The engine also features double overhead camshafts with four valves per cylinder, as well as Weber-Marelli fuel injection and dry sump lubrication.

References 

408 4RM
Rear mid-engine, all-wheel-drive vehicles